Altınyayla District is a district of the Burdur Province of Turkey. Its seat is the town of Altınyayla. Its area is 221 km2, and its population is 5,335 (2021).

Composition
There is one municipality in Altınyayla District:
 Altınyayla

There are 5 villages in Altınyayla District:
 Asmabağ 
 Ballık 
 Çatak 
 Çörten 
 Kızılyaka

References

Districts of Burdur Province